= Hajian Ki Dhok =

- Town
- Location within Pakistan
- Coordinates: 33.26°N 73.21°E
- Country: Pakistan
- Province: (Islamabad Capital Territory) Islamabad C.T
- Elevation: 544 m (1,785 ft)

Population
  - Total: 55,027
- Time zone: UTC+5 (PST)

Hajian Ki Dhok is a town in the Islamabad Capital Territory of Pakistan. It is located at 33°26′0″N 73°21′50″E with an altitude of 544 metres (1,788 feet).
